Jahangirbeyli is a village in the Zangilan District of Azerbaijan.

History 
The village was located in the Armenian-occupied territories surrounding Nagorno-Karabakh, coming under the control of ethnic Armenian forces during the First Nagorno-Karabakh War in the October 1993. The village subsequently became part of the breakaway Republic of Artsakh as part of its Kashatagh Province, referred to as Van. It was recaptured by Azerbaijan in 21 October 2020 during the 2020 Nagorno-Karabakh war.

Demographics 
The village had 187 inhabitants in 2005, and 129 inhabitants, with 32 households in 2015. The population was mainly engaged in agriculture and animal husbandry.

Notable people 
 Elnur Nuriyev — National Hero of Azerbaijan.

References

External links 
 

Populated places in Zangilan District